Katy Hudson is the debut studio album by American singer Katy Hudson (later known as Katy Perry). It was released on March 6, 2001, by Red Hill Records. The album, unlike the subsequent albums that made her known worldwide, primarily incorporates Christian rock and contemporary Christian music elements with lyrical themes of childhood, adolescence, and Hudson's faith in God. Before its release, Red Hill went bankrupt, preventing it from marketing and promoting the album, which subsequently sold about 200 copies and received mixed reviews.

Background
Growing up in a conservative household and raised by pastor parents, Hudson spent most of her childhood with gospel music, as secular music was not permitted. At the age of 15, she began pursuing a career in music and started recording demos and learning to write songs, capturing the attention of Red Hill Studios, who signed her a deal. Hudson then began working on her debut album Katy Hudson.

Music and lyrics

Themes and influences
Katy Hudson saw Hudson exploring Christian rock and contemporary Christian music (CCM). Amongst what was described as an alternative direction were prominent influences of pop rock. During an interview for her official website at the time, Hudson cited artists Jonatha Brooke, Jennifer Knapp, Diana Krall, and Fiona Apple as her musical influences. The album was described as eschewing bubblegum pop and evoking Christian pop songstresses Rachel Lampa and Jaci Velasquez.

Songs
"Trust in Me", "Naturally", and "My Own Monster" were said to capture "loneliness, fear and doubt often ascribed to teens".

The first features "haunting" strings with "electronica effects" and "solid rock roots". An aggressive track, "Piercing" depicts the infatuation people have with expendable things. In "Piercing", Hudson sings: "Lord, help me see the reality / That all I'll ever need is You". "Last Call" was written by Hudson while reading the book Last Call for Help: Changing North America One Teen at a Time, written by Dawson McAllister. Musically, it sees Hudson going into a more jazz-oriented sound. Hudson described "Growing Pains" as an anthem for children and adolescents, explaining that society shares a misconstructed image of them, often viewing them as individuals that do not believe in or do not know much about God.

"Faith Won't Fail" was inspired by faith always sufficing in Bible situations and chapters; and Hudson commented on "Search Me": "I was struggling with the fact that I would have the huge responsibility of how others would be affected through what I was doing or saying on stage. I don't want to put on some kind of front that everything is good when it's not. I wanted to keep it real, but still give people hope." The record closes with "When There's Nothing Left", which has been described as a "crisp and clean 'love note' to God".

Release and promotion
The album was released on March 6, 2001. It was released on two formats: the standard CD and cassette tape. The album was a commercial failure for bankrupted Red Hill Records, only selling between 100 and 200 copies.

Tour
To promote the album, Hudson went on the Strangely Normal Tour, with Phil Joel, Earthsuit, and V*Enna and later embarked on 46 solo performances throughout the United States.

Charts
The song "Trust in Me" spent two weeks on the Radio & Records Christian Rock chart, peaking at number 17. "Search Me" also appeared on the Christian CHR chart, spending three weeks and peaking at number 23.

Critical reception

The album received generally mixed reviews from critics. Stephen Thomas Erlewine from AllMusic awarded the record three stars out of five, stating that with the album, Hudson had "betray[ed] a heavy, heavy debt to Alanis Morissette". Erlewine described the record's overall sound as "the kind of assaultive, over-produced Wall of Sound that some CCM rockers do in order to prove they're contemporary".

Christianity Today writer Russ Breimeier was positive about Katy Hudson, highlighting Hudson's songwriting style for being "insightful and well matched to the emotional power" of Hudson's music. He further deemed Hudson a "young talent" and expected to hear more from her in the next year. Similarly, Tony Cummings from Cross Rhythms also considered Hudson to be a "vocal talent", recommending readers to listen to the album. The Phantom Tollbooth's Andy Argyrakis stated that Hudson having been reared in church had "paid off", and noted that "Although a mere pop lightweight, it's hard to ignore Hudson's sincerity and lyrical maturity." DEP from Billboard, also calling Hudson a talent, classified the record as "textured modern-rock collection that is equal parts grit and vulnerability" and "impressive".

Track listing
Credits extracted from Katy Hudson liner notes.

Personnel 
Adapted from Katy Hudson liner notes.
 Katy Hudson – lead vocals (1–10), background vocals (2, 7, 8)
 Tommy Collier – production (2, 3), acoustic guitars (1), guitars (3), keyboards (2, 3), loops (2, 3)
 Otto Price – production (1, 7, 8), synthesizers (1, 7, 8), bass (1, 2, 4–10), loops (2), programming (1, 7, 8), B-3 (1, 8), additional guitars (7, 8)
 Scott Faircloff – piano (2), keyboards (2, 3), wurlitzer (3)
 David Browning – production (4–6, 9, 10), keyboards and programming (4–6, 9, 10), B-3 (7), piano (8), string arrangements (5, 9, 10)
 Chris Graffagnino – guitars (4-6, 9, 10)
 Barry Graul – electric guitars/12-str (1), guitars (7, 8)
 Tony Morra – drums (2–6, 9, 10)
 Scott Williamson – drums (7, 8)
 Greg Herrington – drums (1), additional drums (7)
 Matt Pierson – bass (3)
 Jeffrey Scot Wills – saxophone (4)
 Otto Price, III – wah guitar (8)
 David McMullan – brass (7)
 Kim Palsma – woodwinds (1, 8)
 David Davidson – violin (1, 7)
 Kristin Wilkinson – viola (1, 7)
 John Catchings – cello (1, 7)
 Mark Stuart (of Audio Adrenaline) – background vocals (1)
 Stacy Tiernan – background vocals (3)

Aftermath
Katy Hudson is the only Christian music-influenced album by Hudson, who subsequently adopted Katy Perry as her stage name. After her popularity increased, previously sold copies of Katy Hudson have become a sought-after item amongst her fans.

References

Further reading
 
 

2001 debut albums
Christian rock albums by American artists
Katy Perry albums
Pamplin Music albums
Contemporary Christian music albums by American artists